Three's a Crowd is a 1945 American mystery film directed by Lesley Selander, written by Dane Lussier, and starring Pamela Blake, Charles Gordon, Gertrude Michael, Pierre Watkin, Virginia Brissac and Ted Hecht. It was released on May 23, 1945, by Republic Pictures. The film was based on the novel Hasty Wedding by Mignon G. Eberhart.

Plot
A woman is accused of killing her former fiancé. She then marries a man who is also a suspect in that murder. The former fiancé turns out to have already been married, then his wife is murdered, as is the family lawyer. Who is setting up whom?

Cast  
Pamela Blake as Diane Whipple
Charles Gordon as Jeffrey Locke
Gertrude Michael as Sophie Whipple
Pierre Watkin as Marcus Pett
Virginia Brissac as Cary Whipple
Ted Hecht as Jacob Walte
Grady Sutton as Willy Davaney
Tom London as Grayson
Roland Varno as Ronald Drew
Frank O'Connor as Policeman
Anne O'Neal as Mamie
Bud Geary as Detective
 Eva Novak as 	Matron
Nanette Vallon as Mme. Francine

References

External links 
 

1945 films
1940s English-language films
American mystery films
1945 mystery films
Republic Pictures films
Films directed by Lesley Selander
American black-and-white films
1940s American films